Karen Elizabeth Wetterhahn (October 16, 1948 – June 8, 1997), also known as Karen Wetterhahn Jennette, was an American professor of chemistry at Dartmouth College, New Hampshire, who specialized in toxic metal exposure. She died of mercury poisoning at the age of 48 due to accidental exposure to the extremely toxic organic mercury compound dimethylmercury. Protective gloves in use at the time of the incident provided insufficient protection, and exposure to only a few drops of the chemical absorbed through the gloves proved to be fatal after less than a year.

Career

Wetterhahn was born in Plattsburgh, New York. She earned her bachelor's degree from St. Lawrence University in 1970 and her doctorate from Columbia University in 1975. Her doctoral work was supervised by Stephen J. Lippard. She joined Dartmouth's faculty in 1976 and published more than 85 research papers. In 1990, Wetterhahn helped establish Dartmouth College's Women in Science Project (WISP), which helped to raise the share of women science majors from 13 to 25 percent at Dartmouth College and has become a national model.

Accident and death

On August 14, 1996, Wetterhahn, a specialist in toxic metal exposure, was studying the way mercury ions interact with DNA repair proteins, and she was investigating the toxic properties of another highly toxic heavy metal, cadmium. She was using dimethylmercury, at the time the standard internal reference for  nuclear magnetic resonance (NMR) measurements.

Wetterhahn would recall that she had spilled several drops of dimethylmercury from the tip of a pipette onto her latex-gloved hand. Not believing herself in any immediate danger, as she was taking all recommended precautions, she proceeded to clean up the area prior to removing her protective clothing. However, tests later revealed that dimethylmercury can, in fact, rapidly permeate different kinds of latex gloves and enter the skin within about 15 seconds. The exposure was later confirmed by hair testing, which showed a dramatic jump in mercury levels 17 days after the initial accident, peaking at 39 days, followed by a gradual decline.

Approximately three months after the initial accident Wetterhahn began experiencing brief episodes of abdominal discomfort and noted significant weight loss. The more distinctive neurological symptoms of mercury poisoning, including loss of balance and slurred speech, appeared in January 1997, five months after the accident. At this point, tests proved that she had a debilitating mercury intoxication. Her blood and urinary mercury content were measured at 4,000 mcg L−1 and 234 µg L−1, respectively – both are well above their respective toxic thresholds of 200 µg L−1 and 50 µg L−1 (blood and urine reference ranges are 1 to 8 µg L−1 and 1 to 5 µg L−1).

Despite aggressive chelation therapy, her condition rapidly deteriorated. Three weeks after the first neurological symptoms appeared, Wetterhahn lapsed into what appeared to be a vegetative state punctuated by periods of extreme agitation. One of her former students said that "Her husband saw tears rolling down her face. I asked if she was in pain. The doctors said it didn't appear that her brain could even register pain." Wetterhahn was removed from life support and died on June 8, 1997, less than a year after her initial exposure.

The case proved that the standard precautions at the time, all of which Wetterhahn had carefully followed, were inadequate for a "super-toxic" chemical like dimethylmercury.  In response, the Occupational Safety and Health Administration recommended that the use of dimethylmercury be avoided unless absolutely necessary and mandated the use of plastic-laminate gloves (SilverShield) when handling this compound. Her death prompted consideration of using an alternative reference material for mercury NMR spectroscopy experiments.

Legacy

Wetterhahn's death shocked not only the entire chemistry department at Dartmouth, but also regulatory agencies, as the accidental exposure occurred despite her having taken all measures required at that time. These included the use of latex gloves, a fume hood, and adherence to standard safety procedures. After Wetterhahn's mercury poisoning was discovered, her colleagues tested various safety gloves against dimethylmercury and found that the small, apolar molecule diffuses through most of them in seconds, much more quickly than expected. As a result, it is now recommended to wear plastic laminate gloves when handling dimethylmercury.

At the time, dimethylmercury was the common calibration standard for  NMR spectroscopy because it has certain advantages over the alternatives that exist. As a consequence of Wetterhahn's accident, safety recommendations have been revised, and the use of dimethylmercury for any purpose has been highly discouraged. Wetterhahn's legacy includes a significant and lasting improvement in laboratory safety.

Dartmouth College has since established an award in Wetterhahn's name (The Karen E. Wetterhahn Graduate Fellowship in Chemistry, created in 1998 and funded by the Karen E. Wetterhahn Memorial Fund) to encourage other women to pursue careers in science. It is a one-year fellowship given to an exceptionally good chemistry graduate student who will receive their PhD within two years. Whenever possible, a woman is preferred for the award. The National Institute of Environmental Health Sciences also maintains an annual award, for a graduate student or post-doctoral researcher, in honor of Karen Wetterhahn (the Karen Wetterhahn Memorial Award).

References

External links 
Remembering Karen Wetterhahn

1948 births
1997 deaths
St. Lawrence University alumni
Columbia University alumni
Dartmouth College faculty
Accidental deaths in New Hampshire
Deaths from heavy metal poisoning
American women chemists
Deaths from laboratory accidents
20th-century American women scientists
20th-century American chemists
People from Plattsburgh, New York
Mercury poisoning
Scientists from New York (state)
American women academics